Anthony John Lacey (born 18 March 1944) is an English former footballer who played as a midfielder for Stoke City, Port Vale, Rochdale, and Stafford Rangers. He made 288 league appearances in a ten-year career in the Football League, and won promotion out of the Fourth Division with Port Vale in 1969–70. He later went into coaching with Stoke City, and served as caretaker-manager for eight games in 1985. He began coaching at the Wolverhampton Wanderers Academy in 1996.

Playing career
Lacey played for Leek C.S.O.B. and St. Luke's College (in Exeter), before joining Tony Waddington's Stoke City. He made one substitute appearances in the First Division in the 1967–68 season, and made four league and cup appearances in the 1968–69 campaign. He then fell out of the first team picture at the Victoria Ground, and never played for the "Potters" again.

Lacey was loaned out to local rivals Port Vale in February 1970. He was an ever-present for the rest of the season and was signed permanently in April 1970 for a fee of £2,500. He scored his first senior goal on 9 March 1970, in a 3–0 win over Hartlepool at Vale Park, and finished the campaign with 18 Fourth Division appearances to his name, as the "Valiants" were promoted in fourth place. He scored two goals in 46 games in the 1970–71 season, missing just two Third Division matches. He scored once in 33 games in the 1971–72 campaign, before playing 29 games in the 1972–73 season, as Gordon Lee took the club to within four points of promotion. Lacey remained a key first team member under new boss Roy Sproson, and scored three goals in 49 appearances in the 1973–74 season. He scored twice in 40 games in the 1974–75 season, but was handed a free transfer to Rochdale in May 1975.

Walter Joyce's "Dale" posted a 15th-place finish in the Fourth Division in the 1975–76 campaign. Brian Green then took charge at Spotland, and led the club to an 18h place finish in 1976–77. Lacey played 83 league games for the club, before moving on to Northern Premier League outfit Stafford Rangers.

Coaching career
After retiring from the field he became the youth coach at Stoke City in 1980, rising through the ranks of Reserve team coach, caretaker manager and finally youth development officer. He was appointed as the club's caretaker-manager in April 1985, following the departure of Bill Asprey. Stoke lost all eight of their matches under his management, and were relegated out of the First Division. He returned to the backroom staff at the Victoria Ground after Mick Mills was appointed as the "Potters" new permanent manager. Lacey left the club in 1996, and later worked at the Wolverhampton Wanderers Academy.

Career statistics

Managerial statistics

Honours
Port Vale
Football League Fourth Division fourth-place promotion: 1969–70

References

1944 births
Living people
Sportspeople from Leek, Staffordshire
English footballers
Association football midfielders
Stoke City F.C. players
Port Vale F.C. players
Rochdale A.F.C. players
Stafford Rangers F.C. players
English Football League players
Northern Premier League players
English football managers
Stoke City F.C. managers
English Football League managers
Association football coaches
Stoke City F.C. non-playing staff
Wolverhampton Wanderers F.C. non-playing staff